Morganiella is a genus of flies belonging to the family Mycetophilidae.

The species of this genus are found in New Zealand.

Species:
 Morganiella fusca Tonnoir & Edwards, 1927

References

Mycetophilidae
Nematocera genera